Cyd Marie Fleming (born 1958) is a Puerto Rican television news journalist. She was once an anchorwoman for a show named "Las Noticias" on  Tele-Once (channel 11), a major Puerto Rican television network.

Career
Fleming has been active in Puerto Rican television for many decades. In 1986, she was hired by TeleOnce to work as a newswoman there, during their evening and nightly news shows. From 1991 to 1997, Fleming was co-host of a show named "Tu Mañana", also at TeleOnce, channel which would later change its name to Univision Puerto Rico.

Fleming was fired from Univision Puerto Rico, however, during 2013. 

For a short period during the 2010s, Fleming worked at canal 6, the Puerto Rican government's educational television channel.

Fleming returned to Univision Puerto Rico during 2021, as co-host of a show named "Jugando Pelota Dura".

On June 12, 2022, Fleming, along with Sylvia Gomez, Luz Nereida Vélez and Eddie Miro (who received a gold circle Emmy for his more than 50 years in Puerto Rican television), was awarded a silver circle Emmy for her long trajectory on Puerto Rican television.

Personal
Fleming is married to Puerto Rican businessman Atilano Cordero Badillo.

See also
 List of Puerto Ricans
 Irish immigration to Puerto Rico
 Anibal Gonzalez Irizarry
 Pedro Rosa Nales
 Keylla Hernandez
 Luis Francisco Ojeda
 Rafael Bracero
 Junior Abrams
 Luis Antonio Cosme
 Jennifer Wolff
 Guillermo Jose Torres

References

Living people
1958 births
Puerto Rican television journalists
Puerto Rican people of Irish descent